Montrose is a residential locality in the local government area (LGA) of Glenorchy in the Hobart LGA region of Tasmania. The 2016 census recorded a population of 2152 for the state suburb of Montrose.
It is a suburb of Hobart.  The suburb is situated in close proximity with Rosetta. Montrose is the suburb directly north of Glenorchy. It is also in Montrose where the Montrose Foreshore Community Park is located.

History 
Montrose was gazetted as a locality in 1961.

The suburb was named after Montrose Estate, established in 1806 by Robert Littlejohn. Built on the estate in 1813, Montrose House is the third oldest house in Tasmania. It is permanently listed on the Tasmanian Heritage Register.

Geography
The waters of the River Derwent form most of the north-eastern boundary.

Road infrastructure 
National Route 1 (Brooker Highway) runs through from north-east to south-east.

Retail/facilities of Montrose
Montrose VET
Chemist
Convenience store
Montrose Bay Yacht Club
Caltex Service Station
Number 28 Metro Tasmania Bus Stop

References

Towns in Tasmania
Localities of City of Glenorchy